Road 16 is a road in the northwest of Iran, which starts from Gilan and passes the cities of Tabriz, Ardabil and Sarab and is connected to Turkey. Some parts of Road 16 are very important because Urmia Lake Bridge is part of this road.

Urmia Lake Bridge

This bridge goes through Lake Urmia and connects East Azerbaijan and West Azerbaijan. The highway was completed on 23 Aban, 1387 (13 November 2008). The bridge is the largest bridge project in Iran. 
This bridge is the longest bridge with seventeen hundred meters and the distance between Tabriz and Urmia contains 135 kilometers reduction. Passing the bridge the distance from Tehran to Urmia is 780 kilometers. This bridge has an important role in the development of the cultural exchanges and tourism and trade between the two provinces of East Azerbaijan and West Azerbaijan and saves time and fuel consumption and reduce road accidents.

References

External links 

 Iran road map on Young Journalists Club

Roads in Iran